Karolyn is an English, and  Swedish feminine given name that is a diminutive form of Carolina and Caroline as well as an alternate form of Karolin.  Notable people referred to by this name include the following:

Given name
Karolyn Ali (1944 – 2015), American film and music video producer
Karolyn Grimes (born 1940), American actress
Karolyn Kirby (born 1961), American beach volleyball player 
Karolyn Nelke (born 1948), American actor, playwright and author
Karolyn Smardz Frost, Canadian historian

See also

Carolyn
Karalyn Patterson
Karilyn
Karlyn
Karolin (name)
Károly
Károlyné Honfi

Notes

English feminine given names
Swedish feminine given names